Louis G. Putterman (born 1952) is an American development economist. He is a professor of economics at Brown University.

Biography 
Putterman received his B.A. from Columbia University in 1976 and Ph.D. from Yale University in 1980. He joined the Brown University faculty after his doctoral studies and received a Sloan Research Fellowship in 1983. He is a specialist on comparative economic systems and has written extensively on China's economic development. His recent work has focused on using laboratory experiments to analyze long-term development of human capabilities.

Putterman served as president of the Association for Comparative Economic Studies in 2000-2001.

References 

Living people
1952 births
American economists
American development economists
Brown University faculty
Columbia College (New York) alumni
Sloan Research Fellows

Yale University alumni